Lamonte McLemore (born September 17, 1939) is an American vocalist, composer, and photographer. He was a founding member of The 5th Dimension, a popular vocal group of the late 1960s and early 1970s.

McLemore married Lisa Harvey and had a daughter named Ciara. In 2014, he wrote and published his autobiography with Robert-Allan Arno, From the Hobo Flats to The 5th Dimension - A Life Fulfilled in Baseball, Photography, and Music.

Biography
McLemore was born in St. Louis, Missouri. He is a professional photographer for Playboy, Ebony, Jet, People, and Harper's Bazaar magazines.

Baseball
McLemore was the first African American athlete to try out for the St. Louis Cardinals. After he moved to Los Angeles, he was a minor league strong-arm pitcher with the Los Angeles Dodgers for a short time.

Photography
After he graduated from high school, McLemore enlisted in the United States Navy, and worked as an aerial photographer.  He co-founded Halmont Graphics with Cliff Hall, and worked there as a photographer beginning in 1958.  McLemore was the first African American photographer hired by Harper's Bazaar magazine and was the photographer for Stevie Wonder's first album cover. McLemore has been a photographer for Jet and Ebony magazines for over forty years. It was because of his photo shoot at the Miss Black Beauty Pageant in the mid-1960s that he met Marilyn McCoo and Florence LaRue which ultimately led to The 5th Dimension being created.

Songwriting
He co-wrote two songs recorded by The 5th Dimension, A Love Like Ours (with Bob Alcivar) and The Singer (with Elliot Willensky).

References

1939 births
Musicians from St. Louis
Living people
Singers from Missouri
20th-century American composers
20th-century American singers
20th-century American male singers
African-American composers
African-American male composers
African-American photographers
American photographers
Baseball players from Missouri